Lundstrom and Lundström is a surname of Swedish origin. The name commonly appears as Lundström within Sweden and as  Lundstrom within English speaking countries.  Lundstrom and Lundström may refer to:

People
Anna Lundström, Swedish figure skater
Åge Lundström (1890–1975), Swedish Air Force general
Carl Lundström, Swedish businessman
Carl August Lundström, Finnish entomologist
Don Lundstrom, American sculptor
 Isac Lundeström, Swedish ice hockey player
Johan Lundström, Swedish biologist and psychologist
John Lundstram, English footballer
John Edvard Lundström (1815–1888), Swedish industrialist and inventor
Klas Lundström (1889–1951), Swedish track and field athlete who competed in the 1912 Summer Olympics
Linda Lundström, Canadian fashion designer
Linden Lundstrom, (1913–1996) American choral conductor, and author
Marjie Lundstrom, American reporter for The Sacramento Bee
Martin Lundström (1918–2016), Swedish cross-country skier
Nina Lundström, Sweden-Finnish Liberal People's Party politician
Oleg Lundstrem (or Lundström, 1916–2005), Soviet-Russian jazz composer and conductor
Sten Lundström, Swedish Left Party politician, member of the Riksdag
Ted Lundström, Swedish bass player, Amon Amarth
Tord Lundström, Swedish retired professional ice hockey player and coach
Vilhelm Lundstrøm, (1893–1950) Danish modernist painter

Other
7047 Lundström - main belt asteroid

Surnames
Swedish-language surnames